Mikhail Elgin and Teymuraz Gabashvili were the defending champions, but Gabashvili chose not to compete this year. Elgin played alongside Alexander Kudryavtsev and lost in the first round to Frank Moser and Alexander Satschko.

Lukáš Lacko and Ante Pavić won the title, defeating Frank Moser and Alexander Satschko 6–3, 3–6, [13–11] in the final.

Seeds

Draw

Draw

References
 Main Draw

Tashkent Challenger - Doubles
2014 Doubles